50 Cent Is the Future is the second mixtape by American rapper 50 Cent and first one by his rap group G-Unit. It was released on June 1, 2002 via Street Dance/Thurd World Muzic. The lone guest appearance is provided by UTP, which marks the first collaboration between the group and future member Young Buck.

In September 2004, the album was charted at number 59 in Switzerland and at number 65 in the United Kingdom. In 2006, the album was ranked at #7 on the 'Top Ten Mixtape List Of All Time' by XXL, and at #22 on 'The 50 Best Rap Mixtapes of the Millennium' by Pitchfork.

Background 
The mixtape was recorded in 2001 after 50 Cent was dropped from Columbia Records and blacklisted from the recording industry due to his controversial song "Ghetto Qu'ran (Forgive Me)", leaving his debut studio album Power of the Dollar unreleased. He then traveled to Canada to record the mixtape due to being unable to find a studio in the United States that would allow him to record. The project mostly revisits material by Mobb Deep and features Southern hip hop group UTP represented by Skip, Young Buck and Juvenile. After 50 Cent Is the Future, he recorded his 2002 compilation mixtape Guess Who's Back?, which "G-Unit That's What's Up" is included in.

Track listing

Charts

References

External links

G-Unit albums
50 Cent albums
2002 mixtape albums